Chalim Perry (born April 8, 2003), known by his stage name Sha EK, is an American rapper and producer from The Bronx, New York. He is currently signed to Warner Records and Defiant Records. He released his major label debut mixtape, Face of the What, in September 2022.

Early life

Chalim Perry was born and raised in The Bronx, New York. His parents are both Honduran. He grew up primarily in the Melrose neighborhood in the South Bronx. At age 15, he suffered a gunshot wound, which prompted him to start rapping.

Career

Sha EK began releasing music at age 15 in 2018. In 2020, he released the single, "D&D". The song would go on to accumulate 8 million streams on Spotify by September 2022. In July 2022, Sha EK was signed to Warner Records. In August of that year, he released the single "We Droppin'" featuring PGF Nuk. That song appeared on his major label debut mixtape, Face of the What, in September 2022. The collection also featured guest appearances from SleazyWorld Go and Bandmanrill.

Discography

Mixtapes

Singles

References

External links
Sha EK on Instagram

Living people
Warner Records artists
American rappers
Rappers from the Bronx
2003 births